The Charlotte Post, founded in 1878, is an African American, English language weekly newspaper community based in Charlotte, North Carolina. The Charlotte Post has been distributed in countries surrounding Mecklenburg and upstate South Carolina. The Post is read by thousands of area residents and has earned numerous national and local journalism and service awards.  The newspaper is owned by The Charlotte Post Publishing Company in Charlotte, North Carolina.

History
The paper is regarded as a leading provider of news and entertainment coverage from a Black perspective.

It is a weekly broadsheet that at one time sold for $1 a copy, as well as distributed at no charge at dark green vendor boxes located in Uptown Charlotte and throughout the city primarily in African-American neighborhoods.

The Charlotte Post is published by The Charlotte Post Publishing Company. A sister newspaper, The Triangle Tribune, serves the Research Triangle area.

The Charlotte Post Foundation 
The Charlotte Post Foundation is a 501c3 foundation that provides services to uplift and empower people in underserved communities through educational programs. They provide after school programs for elementary children in Title I schools, offer community convening sessions to discuss issues impacting at risk communities and give scholarships to African American students.

The Post Foundation operates through three distinct programs: corrective education programs, community education programs and continuing education programs. The Educational Programs are specifically intended for elementary school students. The Community Education Programs allow for discussion on relevant community issues. The Continuing Education Programs provide scholarships for students to continue pursuing higher education.

The Charlotte Post Staff 
The Charlotte Post is run by a group of individuals, including the following. 
 Gerald Johnson—Publisher & CEO
 Robert Johnson—Publisher & GM
 Herbert White—Editor In Chief 
 Bonitta Best—Managing Editor 
 Ashley Mahoney—Multimedia Journalist 
 Patrice Johnson—Virtual Illustrations 
 Linda Johnson—Sales & Marketing Manager 
 Tania Johnson—Receptionist

Archives Available 
Back issues of The Charlotte Post are now available digitally thanks to Johnson C. Smith University. The digitized issues are available online and cover 1930-2006, with the majority of issues covering 1971-2006.

See also
 List of newspapers published in North Carolina

References

External links
Charlotte Post official site
Back issues of the Charlotte Post from 1930-2006 (not all inclusive)

African-American history in Charlotte, North Carolina
Weekly newspapers published in North Carolina
Mass media in Charlotte, North Carolina
African-American newspapers
Publications established in 1878
1878 establishments in North Carolina